Hussein Mussa Mzee (born 1 March 1964) is a Tanzanian CCM politician and Member of Parliament for Jangombe constituency since 2010.

References

1964 births
Living people
Tanzanian Muslims
Chama Cha Mapinduzi MPs
Tanzanian MPs 2010–2015
Lumumba Secondary School alumni